The Peanuts Movie (known in some countries as Snoopy and Charlie Brown: A Peanuts Movie) is a 2015 American computer-animated comedy film based on Charles M. Schulz's comic strip Peanuts, produced by Blue Sky Studios and distributed by 20th Century Fox. It is the fifth full-length Peanuts film and the first in 35 years. The film is directed by Steve Martino from a screenplay by Craig and Bryan Schulz (Schulz's son and grandson, respectively), and Cornelius Uliano, and stars the voices of Noah Schnapp as Charlie Brown and, via archival recordings, Bill Melendez as Snoopy and Woodstock. The film sees Charlie Brown trying to improve his odds with the Little Red-Haired Girl, while Snoopy writes a book where he is a World War I Flying Ace trying to save his fellow pilot and love interest Fifi from the Red Baron and his flying circus.

Development of the film began in 2006, six years after the death of Charles Schulz and the final release of the last Peanuts comic strip. Craig Schulz, the son of Charles, pitched a film idea to his son, Bryan Schulz. Twentieth Century Fox and Blue Sky Studios announced development of a computer-animated film in October 2012, with Steve Martino directing, due to his faithfulness to the style of Dr. Seuss in the film, Horton Hears a Who! (2008), also produced by Blue Sky. Numerous elements from the comic strip were featured in the film, such as Charlie Brown's skating pond, his house, "the wall" and Lucy's psychiatrist booth, as well as the Snoopy and Woodstock voice tracks from Bill Melendez. The soundtrack was composed by Christophe Beck, with contributions by Meghan Trainor and David Benoit.

The Peanuts Movie premiered in New York City on November 1, 2015, and was released in the United States five days later. It grossed $246 million worldwide against a $99 million budget to become the 7th highest-grossing animated film of 2015. The film was met with generally positive reviews from critics, with praise for the animation, voice acting, and faithfulness to the source material. It received nominations for the Annie Award for Best Animated Feature, the Critics' Choice Movie Award for Best Animated Feature, and was the first Blue Sky Studios film to be nominated for a Golden Globe Award for Best Animated Feature Film, but lost to Inside Out.

Plot

When the Little Red-Haired Girl moves into the neighborhood, Charlie Brown becomes infatuated with her, though worries his long-running streak of failures will prevent her from noticing him. After Lucy tells him he should try being more confident, Charlie Brown decides to embark upon a series of new activities in hope of finding one that will get the Little Red-Haired Girl to notice him. 

Helped by Snoopy and Woodstock, he performs a magic show act in the school's talent show; however, he is forced to drop his act in order to help his sister Sally with hers. Charlie Brown then signs up for the school dance and gets Snoopy to teach him. At the dance, Charlie Brown attracts praise for his skills, but he slips during his performance. This sets one of his shoes to hit the sprinkler, causing the dance to be cut short and the students to look down upon him once more.

Charlie Brown is partnered with the Little Red-Haired Girl to write a book report. When she is called away for a week to deal with a family illness, Charlie Brown decides to write the report alone, on the collegiate-level novel War and Peace, to which he writes a comprehensive report. At the same time, Charlie Brown finds he is the only student to get a perfect score on a standardized test taken earlier that school year. His friends and the other students congratulate him, and his popularity begins to climb. 

However, when he goes to accept a medal at a school assembly, he learns the test papers were accidentally mixed up, and that Peppermint Patty was actually the one who got the perfect score. Saddened that his sudden popularity was all for nothing, Charlie Brown reveals the mistake and declines the medal, thus becoming unpopular again. To make matters worse, his book report is accidentally shredded by Linus' model tri-plane, causing him to admit to the Little Red-Haired Girl that he has caused them both to fail the assignment.

Meanwhile, Snoopy writes a novel about his World War I Flying Ace persona trying to save Fifi from the Red Baron with help from Woodstock and his friends, using the key events and situations surrounding Charlie Brown as inspiration to develop his story. He acts out his adventure physically and coming across Charlie Brown and the gang several times along the way. Snoopy, in the end, manages to defeat the Red Baron by kamikaze and save Fifi.

Before leaving school for summer, Charlie Brown is surprised when the Little Red-Haired Girl chooses him for a pen pal. Linus convinces Charlie Brown he needs to tell the Little Red-Haired Girl how he feels about her before she leaves for the summer. Racing to her house, he discovers she is about to leave on a bus for summer camp. He tries to chase the bus but is prevented from reaching it. Just as he is about to give up, Charlie Brown sees a kite fall from the Kite-Eating Tree. The string becomes entangled around his waist and sails away with him. Amazed to see Charlie Brown flying a kite, his friends follow. Upon reaching the bus, Charlie Brown finally asks the Little Red-Haired Girl why she has chosen him in spite of his failures. The Little Red-Haired Girl explains she admires his selflessness and determination, calling him an honest, caring, and compassionate person. As a result, everyone congratulates Charlie Brown for his efforts, hard work, and for being a true friend.

In the first mid-credits scene, Lucy tries to convince Charlie Brown to kick the football once more. Charlie Brown is apprehensive, but Lucy tells him that she now understands that he is kind, compassionate, brave, and funny and that no one would pull a football away from someone with all of those qualities. Charlie Brown, convinced, agrees once more, only for Lucy to pull the football away and adds smugly that she forgot to say that he is gullible, causing Charlie Brown to smile. In the second mid-credits scene, Snoopy, Fifi, Woodstock, the Beagle Scouts, and Snoopy's siblings celebrate Snoopy's victory over the Red Baron with root beer, that is until the Red Baron shows up again and knocks Snoopy into the root beer causing him to angrily shout "Curse you, Red Baron!" (via thought bubble). In the post-credits scene, Linus' model tri-plane finally sputters to a stop over the pond and falls straight in.

Cast

 Noah Schnapp as Charlie Brown
 Hadley Belle Miller as Lucy
 Mariel Sheets as Sally
 Alex Garfin as Linus
 Francesca Angelucci Capaldi as the Little Red-Haired Girl and Frieda. Describing the Little Red-Haired Girl, Capaldi says: "She's very nice and kind and has a great heart. She really does like Charlie Brown, but he has no idea, because he's shy and awkward."
 Venus Omega Schultheis as Peppermint Patty
 Rebecca Bloom as Marcie
 Marelik "Mar Mar" Walker as Franklin
 Noah Johnston as Schroeder
 Anastasia Bredikhina as Patty
 Madisyn Shipman as Violet
 AJ Tecce as Pig-Pen
 Micah Revelli as Little Kid
 William "Alex" Wunsch as Shermy
 Troy "Trombone Shorty" Andrews as Miss Othmar and the Little Red-Haired Girl's mother. Andrews' trombone provided their "wah-wah" voices, along with the voices for other adult characters in the film.
 Kristin Chenoweth as Fifi, Snoopy's love interest. Chenoweth created "a series of conversational-like sounds" to create Fifi's language, using Melendez's Snoopy recordings as a guide, and making his sounds more feminine.
 Bill Melendez as Snoopy and Woodstock (from archival recordings). Woodstock and his bird friends are part of Snoopy's Beagle Scouts, who serve as the World War I Flying Ace's (Snoopy's) repair crew.

Snoopy's siblings also appear during the end credits.

Production

Development

In 2006, six years after the release of the last original Peanuts strip, as well as the death of creator Charles M. Schulz, his son Craig Schulz came up with an idea for a new  Peanuts film, which he showed to his screenwriter son Bryan Schulz. "I was happy to show my son," Craig said. "He showed me how to make it bigger—how to blow it up more—and he helped me put in structure." When presenting their film to studios, Craig stipulated that the film remain under Schulz control, saying, "We need[ed] to have absolute quality control and keep it under Dad's legacy... You can't bring people in from the outside and expect them to understand Peanuts." On October 9, 2012, it was announced that 20th Century Fox and Blue Sky Studios were developing a 3D computer-animated feature film based on the strip, with Steve Martino directing from the screenplay by Craig Schulz, Bryan Schulz, and Cornelius Uliano. Craig, Bryan, and Uliano also produced. Craig, stating there is no one "more protective of the comic strip than myself," chose Martino as director because he showed faithfulness to literature in his adaptation of Dr. Seuss' Horton Hears a Who!.

On the film's plot, Martino said: "Here's where I lean thematically. I want to go through this journey... Charlie Brown is that guy who, in the face of repeated failure, picks himself back up and tries again. That's no small task. I have kids who aspire to be something big and great... a star football player or on Broadway. I think what Charlie Brown is—what I hope to show in this film—is the everyday qualities of perseverance... to pick yourself back up with a positive attitude—that's every bit as heroic... as having a star on the Walk of Fame or being a star on Broadway. That's the [story's] core. This is a feature film story that has a strong dramatic drive, and takes its core ideas from the strip." Martino and his animators spent over a year looking at Charles M. Schulz's original drawing style to help translate the "hand-drawn warmth... into the cool pixel-precision of CGI" without the fear of something getting lost in translation, such as "how the dot of an eye [conveyed] joy or sorrow so efficiently". In addition to receiving the rights to use Bill Melendez's voice for Snoopy and Woodstock, Martino was also able to get the rights to archive music from previous Peanuts specials. Classic locations are featured, such as Charlie Brown's skating pond, his house, "the wall" and Lucy's psychiatrist booth, each retaining their "eternal look of the strip." Additionally, despite being outdated technology, rotary phones and typewriters are seen, as well as Lucy's psychiatrist booth still costing a nickel. Adult characters' "wah-wah" voices are represented by a trombone with a plunger mute, as in previous Peanuts media, courtesy of New Orleans jazz musician Trombone Shorty. Because of the robust number of existing Peanuts characters, the film does not introduce any new characters.

On January 8, 2013, Leigh Anne Brodsky became the managing director of Peanuts Worldwide and was set to control all the global deals for the film. In April 2013, Fox announced that the film would be released in 3D. In October 2013, it was announced that Paul Feig would also produce. By April 2015, 75% of the animation was complete, with some footage scheduled to debut at CinemaCon in Las Vegas.

Music and soundtrack

In October 2014, it was announced that Christophe Beck would score the film. Beck stated, "With the Peanuts movies, I grew up on those specials from the '60s and '70s, that, of course, rerun to this day. I'm very fond of all that Vince Guaraldi music, so what we did was try to find spots in the film where we could sort of touch down and remind people who were watching the film that it's still a Peanuts movie, and there's still a place for that music in the film. There's a bunch of spots where we quote the Guaraldi music, or we actually re-record his pieces quite faithfully." He also added that the score would be more orchestral than Guaraldi's previous scores, which were mainly a small jazz combo. Jazz pianist David Benoit contributed to Beck's score.

On July 28, 2015, it was announced that Meghan Trainor would write and perform a song for the film, entitled "Better When I'm Dancin'". Epic Records released the soundtrack album on October 23, 2015. The 20-track album features Trainor's "Better When I'm Dancin", Flo Rida's "That's What I Like" featuring Fitz, "Linus and Lucy", "Skating" and "Christmas Time Is Here" by Vince Guaraldi, from the A Charlie Brown Christmas album, and 15 tracks of Beck's original score for the film. An exclusive edition of the soundtrack released at Target features a second Trainor track, "Good to Be Alive". The Japanese edition of the soundtrack includes "Good to Be Alive" and three more tracks from Beck's score. The Japan version of the movie also uses Japanese singer-songwriter Ayaka's "A Song For You" for the trailer and the ending instead of Trainor's, but it was released as a single and did not appear on the Japanese edition of the soundtrack album.

Release

Premiere and theatrical release
The Peanuts Movie held its premiere in New York City on November 1, 2015, and was released on November 6, 2015, in the United States on 3,897 screens. The release commemorates the 65th anniversary of the comic strip and the 50th anniversary of the TV special A Charlie Brown Christmas. The film was originally scheduled for November 25, 2015, and in November 2012 was rescheduled to November 6, 2015. The film was released as Snoopy and Charlie Brown: The Peanuts Movie in United Kingdom on December 18, 2015. The Australian release date was supposed to be December 21, 2015 but was postponed to January 8, 2016.

Video game
A video game based on the film, titled Snoopy's Grand Adventure, was released on November 3, 2015, for Xbox 360, Nintendo 3DS, Wii U, Xbox One, and PlayStation 4, and published by Activision.

Home media
The Peanuts Movie was released on digital platforms on February 12, 2016, before being released on DVD, Blu-ray, Blu-ray 3D, and 4K Ultra HD a month later on March 8, 2016. The film debuted at the top of the home media sales chart for the week ending on March 13, 2016.

Reception

Box office
The Peanuts Movie grossed $130.2 million in North America and $116 million in other territories for a worldwide total of $246.2 million.

The film grossed $12.1 million on its opening day, earning a total of $44 million for the weekend (with 27% of the gross coming from 3D screenings), finishing second at the box office behind Spectre ($70.4 million). Outside North America, the film opened in the same week as the U.S. and grossed $4.56 million from 12 markets. China ($2.76 million) and Italy ($1.16 million) delivered the biggest openings. After three weekends, it opened to a total of 49 markets where it had the second biggest opening of 2015 in Mexico ($3.1 million) and debuted in the U.K., Ireland and Malta at No. 2 with $5.5 million (including previews) behind Star Wars: The Force Awakens. One of the final markets was Australia where the film opened on New Year's Day 2016, earning $2.6 million in its first week.

Critical response
The review aggregation website Rotten Tomatoes reported  approval rating and an average rating of  based on  reviews, making it the highest-rated film produced by Blue Sky Studios. The site's consensus states: "The Peanuts Movie offers a colorful gateway into the world of its classic characters and a sweetly nostalgic – if relatively unambitious – treat for the adults who grew up with them." On Metacritic, the film has a weighted average score of 67 out of 100 based on 31 critics, indicating "generally favorable reviews". On CinemaScore, audiences gave the film an average grade of "A" on an A+ to F scale.

The Hollywood Reporters Michael Rechtshaffen found the film to be especially praiseworthy, feeling that Charles Schulz would have been proud of the film, though he criticized the use of Trainor's song in an otherwise good use of Guaraldi's themes with Beck's score. Peter Debruge of Variety gave similar sentiments, especially praising the animation of the film. Alonso Duralde of TheWrap felt the film made a nice transition to 3D, saying, while the film might not reach "the melancholy of earlier films... it nonetheless respects the importance of failure and disappointment that Schulz always included in his storytelling". He did, however, feel that Peanuts purists would take issue with a few things in the film, such as seeing and hearing so much of the Little Red-Haired Girl, who was always off-panel in the comic strips, and Peppermint Patty acknowledging that Snoopy is a dog and not a child with a big nose (even though, unbeknownst to him, Marcie told her that Snoopy was a beagle in the latter years of the strip). Pete Hammond from Deadline Hollywood admitted his trepidation about translating the characters from 2D to 3D, but enjoyed the film overall, only criticizing the amount of fantasy sequences involving Snoopy. Brian Truitt of USA Today gave the film three out of four stars, proclaiming the film "is all about simplicity, and what the plot lacks in nuance and complexity is made up for with relatable characters whom people have spent a lifetime watching. The movie is a testament to Charlie Brown's place in pop culture and a showcase for a new generation bound to fall in love with its perennially insecure star". Neil Genzlinger from The New York Times named the film an NYT Critics' Pick, calling it "the most charming and the most daring experiment in human genetics ever conducted". However, he also showed concern for the modern children's audiences who may or may not only know the Peanuts gang from the holiday specials.

Scott Mendelson from Forbes was more critical of the film, saying there was "nothing objectively wrong with The Peanuts Movie", but as he personally was not a fan of the Peanuts comic strip, that made him "anti-Charlie Brown", loathing each time Charlie Brown failed in the film. Joe McGovern from Entertainment Weekly was also not as receptive, giving the film a grade of C+, and criticizing the animation, stating, "Even if you assume that Schulz always wanted his frozen pond reflecting lustrous light and Snoopy frolicking in a lavish Hayao Miyazaki world, the animation steroids injected into the aesthetic here nonetheless shrivel the great melancholy that's so key to the comic's endurance".

Accolades, awards and nominations

Future
Although The Peanuts Movie has been described as a success, and Fox was reportedly interested in making a sequel and turning The Peanuts Movie into a franchise, Fox only had the rights to make one Peanuts film. Schulz's widow, Jean, has indicated that a sequel is not imminent, stating, "This one took eight years, so maybe we'll talk again then."

See also
 Peanuts filmography

References

External links

 
 
 

2015 films
2015 3D films
2015 comedy films
2015 computer-animated films
2010s American animated films
American children's animated comedy films
American computer-animated films
Animated films about friendship
2010s English-language films
20th Century Fox animated films
20th Century Fox Animation films
Films produced by Paul Feig
Films scored by Christophe Beck
Films based on American comics
Films directed by Steve Martino
Peanuts films
Blue Sky Studios films
3D animated films
20th Century Fox films
Animated films about children
Animated films about dogs
Animated films about birds